An anti-proverb or a perverb is the transformation of a standard proverb for humorous effect.  Paremiologist Wolfgang Mieder defines them as "parodied, twisted, or fractured proverbs that reveal humorous or satirical speech play with traditional proverbial wisdom". Anti-proverbs are ancient, Aristophanes having used one in his play Peace, substituting  "bell" (in the unique compound "bellfinch") for  "bitch, female dog", twisting the standard and familiar "The hasty bitch gives birth to blind" to "The hasty bellfinch gives birth to blind".

Anti-proverbs have also been defined as "an allusive distortion, parody, misapplication, or unexpected contextualization of a recognized proverb, usually for comic or satiric effect". To have full effect, an anti-proverb must be based on a known proverb. For example, "If at first you don't succeed, quit" is only funny if the hearer knows the standard proverb "If at first you don't succeed, try, try again". Anti-proverbs are used commonly in advertising, such as "Put your burger where your mouth is" from Red Robin. Anti-proverbs are also common on T-shirts, such as "Taste makes waist" and "If at first you don't succeed, skydiving is not for you". 

Standard proverbs are essentially defined phrases, well known to many people, as e. g. Don't bite the hand that feeds you. When this sequence is deliberately slightly changed ("Don't bite the hand that looks dirty") it becomes an anti-proverb. The relationship between anti-proverbs and proverbs, and a study of how much a proverb can be changed before the resulting anti-proverb is no longer seen as proverbial, are still open topics for research.

Classification 

There have been various attempts at classifying different types of anti-proverbs, based on structure and semantics, including by Mieder, Litovkina, and Valdeva.  What follows is somewhat synthetic of these.

Classification on formal criteria 
 Association: The similarity to the original sequence is strong enough to identify it, but there is no further connection: The early worm gets picked first.
 Change of homonyms: A word which has several meanings is interpreted in a new way: Where there's a will, there's a lawsuit.
 Combination: Two sequences are combined: One brain washes the other.
 Permutation: While keeping the syntactic structure, the words are jumbled: A waist is a terrible thing to mind.
 Abridgement: The sequence is cut and thus changed completely: All's well that ends.
 Substitution: Parts of the sequence are replaced: Absence makes the heart go wander.
 Supplementation: A sentence with a contrasting meaning is added to the original sequence: A man's home is his castle – let him clean it.
 Syntactic change: The semantic structure of the sentence changes while the sequence of words stays the same: Men think: "God governs." – A good man will think of himself: after, all the others.

Classification on content criteria 
 Mitigation: The meaning seems kept, but is qualified by the supplement: Everything has an end, but a sausage has two.
 Apology: The original sequence is defended against attacks: German example, translated: Art (Kunst) comes from 'able' (können), not from 'will' (wollen), or we'd better call it wirt (Wulst or Wunst, fantasy word).
 Conservation: The meaning is similar, with and without the supplement: There is no such thing as a free lunch, but there is always free cheese in a mousetrap.
 Break of metaphor: Metaphors are interpreted literally: Duty is calling? We call back.
 Neogenesis: The meaning of the new sentence is completely independent of the original one: An onion a day keeps everybody away.

Types of humorous effects 
 Bisociation: This is a technical term coined by Arthur Koestler. He says that a funny text is situated in two different semantic levels. In the beginning, the hearer or reader is aware of only one of them. In the punch line, the second level comes up so suddenly that they start laughing. The sudden coming up of the second level is the point. For example: I only want your best – your money.
 Destruction: If the sublime is pulled down to banality, some of us feel validated. Generally, this is funnier than the contrary. Therefore, many humorous transformations are made up this way: Jesus may love you – but will he respect you in the morning?
 Fictional catastrophe: Unlike real disasters, catastrophes which are only made up or solved in one's mind might be humorous, as can be seen in the quotation: The light at the end of the tunnel is only muzzle flash.

History

Anti-proverbs have been used and recognized for a long time. The Greek musician Stratonicus of Athens used an anti-proverb to mock a cithara-singer who had been nicknamed "Ox". He twisted the standard Greek proverb "The ass hears the lyre", replacing the first word to produce "The Ox hears the lyre."

However, the term "anti-proverb" was not coined until 1982 by Wolfgang Mieder. The term became more established with the publication of Twisted Wisdom: Modern Anti-Proverbs by Wolfgang Mieder and Anna T. Litovkina,

They were one of the many experimental styles explored by the French literary movement Oulipo.  The term perverb is attributed to Maxine Groffsky.  The concept was popularised by Oulipo collaborator Harry Mathews in his Selected Declarations of Dependence (1977).

Anti-proverbs have been alternatively named "postproverbials" by Aderemi Raji-Oyelad, (also known by his pen name, Remi Raji). This term has been adopted by some African proverb scholars, seen in a large collection of articles about antiproverbs/postproverbials in the journal Matatu  51,2 , edited by Aderemi Raji-Oyelade and Olayinka Oyeleye.

Anti-proverbs in literature
Some authors have bent and twisted proverbs, creating anti-proverbs, for a variety of literary effects. For example, in the Harry Potter novels, J. K. Rowling reshapes a standard English proverb into "It's no good crying over spilt potion" and Professor Dumbledore advises Harry not to "count [his] owls before they are delivered".

From Nigeria, Adeyemi shows the use of both proverbs and anti-proverbs in Rérẹ́ Rún by Okediji.
 Adeyemi believes that they add humor, color and beauty to his writing. But on a political plane, he believes "Anti-proverbs were also used to stimulate critical consciousness in the readers to fight for their rights but with wisdom. The conclusion of the paper was that the conscious manipulation of the so-called fixed proverbs could generate new proverbs, encourage creativity in the writers and expose hidden meanings of proverbs."

In a slightly different use of reshaping proverbs, in the Aubrey–Maturin series of historical naval novels by Patrick O'Brian, Capt. Jack Aubrey humorously mangles and mis-splices proverbs, such as "Never count the bear's skin before it is hatched" and "There's a good deal to be said for making hay while the iron is hot."
An earlier fictional splicer of proverb is a character found in a novel by Beatrice Grimshaw, producing such combinations as "Make hay while the iron is hot" (very similar to an example from Capt. Aubrey) and "They lock the stable door when the milk is spilt". 

Part of G. K. Chesterton’s reputation as the “Prince of Paradoxes” rested on his ability to turn proverbs and clichés on their heads. One example of this facility occurs in his What’s Wrong with the World: Arguing that the education of children is better left to their mothers than to professional educators, he ends his argument with, “... [I]f a thing is worth doing, it is worth doing badly.” Commenting on this, Dale Ahlquist in the Society of Gilbert Keith Chesterton blog, argues that there is considerable good sense in this paradoxical anti-proverb. He cites Chesterton’s own remark that “Paradox has been defined as ‘Truth standing on her head to get attention’”,  and  notes that Chesterton in the same passage explicitly concedes that there are things, like astronomy, that need to be done very well; whereas when it comes to writing love letters or blowing one’s nose, Chesterton argues that, “These things we want a man to do for himself, even if he does them badly.”

Variations

Splicing two proverbs
In a slightly different pattern of reshaping proverbs humorously, pieces of multiple proverbs can be spliced together, e.g. "Never count the bear's skin before it is hatched" and "There's a good deal to be said for making hay while the iron is hot."

Garden path proverb
The term has also been used to describe a garden path sentence based on a proverb; namely, a sentence that starts out like the proverb, but ends in such a way that the listener is forced to back up and re-parse several words in order to get its real sense:
 Time flies like to fly around clocks.("time flies like an arrow" / the habits of "time flies", a fictitious kind of fly.)

Proverbs beginning with Time flies like ... are popular examples in linguistics, e.g. to illustrate concepts related to syntax parsing. These examples are presumably inspired by the quip "Time flies like the wind; fruit flies like a banana", attributed to Groucho Marx.

To be effective in written form, a garden-path proverb must have the same spelling and punctuation as the original proverb, up to the point where the reader is supposed to back up, as in the "time flies" example above.  These spelling or punctuation constraints may be relaxed in perverbs that are spoken, rather than written:
 Don't count your chickens will do it for you.("don't count your chickens before they hatch" / "don't count, your chickens will ...")
 Think before you were born you were already loved.("think before you act" vs. "think: before you were born, you were ...")
 You can't teach an old dog would be better for your students.("you can't teach an old dog new tricks" / "you can't teach; an old dog would be ...")

Proverb with surprising or silly ending

The term is also used in the weaker sense of any proverb that was modified to have an unexpected, dumb, amusing, or nonsensical ending—even if the changed version is no harder to parse than the original:
 A rolling stone gathers momentum.("A rolling stone gathers no moss".)
 All that glitters is not dull.("All that glitters is not gold".)
 Don't put the cart before the aardvark.("Don't put the cart before the horse".)
 See a pin and pick it up, and all day long you'll have a pin.("See a pin and pick it up, and all day long you'll have good luck".)
 A penny saved is a penny taxed.("A penny saved is a penny earned".)
 Misery loves bacon.("Misery loves company.")

The perverb "A rolling stone gathers momentum" (based on the saying by Publilius Syrus) is moderately popular in technology-minded circles, having been featured in several bumper stickers and T-shirts.

Pun on a proverb
The word has also been used for puns on proverbs:
 Slaughter is the best medicine.("Laughter is the best medicine".)
 Fine swords butter no parsnips.("Fine words butter no parsnips".)
 What doesn't kill you makes you stranger.("What doesn't kill you makes you stronger".)
 Nothing succeeds like excess.("Nothing succeeds like success".)
 Levity is the soul of wit.("Brevity is the soul of wit".)
 Absence makes the heart go wander.("Absence makes the heart grow fonder".)

See also 
 Malapropism
 Transpositional pun
 Wellerism

References

Further reading 
 Aleksa, Melita, T. Litovkina Anna, Hrisztova-Gotthardt, Hrisztalina. 2009. The Reception of Anti-Proverbs in the German Language Area. Proceedings of the Second Interdisciplinary Colloquium on Proverbs,  Soares, Rui, JB, Lauhakangas, Outi (ed). – Tavira, pp. 83–98. Tavira, Portugal.
 Arnaud, Pierre J. L., François Maniez and  Vincent Renner. 2015.  Non-Canonical Proverbial Occurrences and Wordplay: A Corpus Investigation and an Enquiry Into Readers’ Perception of Humour and Cleverness. In  Wordplay and Metalinguistic / Metadiscursive Reflection: Authors, Contexts, Techniques, and Meta-Reflection, Angelika Zirker, Esme Winter-Froemel (eds.), 135-159.  De Gruyter.  Stable URL: https://www.jstor.org/stable/j.ctvbkk30h.9
 Gossler, Erika: Besser arm dran als Bein ab. Anti-Sprichwörter und ihresgleichen. Vienna 2005. (In German) .
 Kozintsev, Alexander. "Notes on Russian anti-proverbs." Scala naturae. Festschrift in honour of Arvo Krikmann (2014): 241-258.
 Litovkina, Anna T. 2011. "Where there's a will there's a lawyer's bill": Lawyers in Anglo-American anti-proverbs. Acta Juridica Hungarica 52.1: 82–96.
 Litovkina, Anna T., Katalin Vargha, Péter Barta, Hrisztalina Hrisztova-Gotthardt. 2007. Most frequent types of alteration in Anglo-American, German, French, Russian and Hungarian anti-proverbs. Acta Ethnographica Hungarica 52.1: 47–103.
 Litovkina, Anna T., Hrisztalina Hrisztova-Gotthardt, Péter Barta, Katalin Vargha, and Wolfgang Mieder. Anti-Proverbs in Five Languages: Structural Features and Verbal Humor Devices. 2021. Palgrave Macmillan.
 Milică, Ioan. 2013. Proverbes et anti-proverbes. Philologica Jassyensia An IX, Nr. 1 (17), p. 63 – 68.
 Pavlović, Vladan. 2016. Anti-Proverbs in English and Serbian. FACTA UNIVERSITATI (Linguistics and Literature) Vol. 14, No 2: 129-136.
 Mohamadi, Mandana Kolahdouz, and Mina Kolahdouz Mohamadi. "Analyzing the Structure of Turkish, Persian, and English Anti-Proverbs Based on Reznikov Model." Research Journal of English Language and Literature 3, no. 3 (2015): 422-451.
 Reznikov, Andrey. 2009. Old Wine in New Bottles. Modern Russian Anti-Proverbs. Proverbium Supplement Series, Volume 27.  
 Reznikov, Andrey. 2012. Russian Anti-proverbs of the 21st Century: A Sociolinguistic Dictionary. Proverbium Supplement Series, Volume 35. .

Humour
Proverbs